Floodway may refer to:
Flood bypass
Flood control channel
Floodway (road), a flood plain crossing for a road
The community of Floodway, Arkansas